Paul G. Mezey is a Hungarian-Canadian mathematical chemist. He was the Canada Research Chair in Scientific Modeling and Simulation in the Department of Chemistry at the Memorial University of Newfoundland. He retired from Memorial University in 2018.

Biography
Mezey earned a Master's degrees in chemistry, a Ph.D. in Chemistry, and a Master's degree in mathematics, all from Eötvös Loránd University in Budapest, in the years 1967, 1970, and 1972 respectively. 
From 1982 to 2003, he was a professor of chemistry and mathematics at the University of Saskatchewan, where he earned a D. Sc. in 1985 in mathematical chemistry. He was a faculty member at Memorial University from 2003 to 2018.

Mezey is editor in chief of the Journal of Mathematical Chemistry.

Awards and honors

In 2003, Mezey received a Canada Research Chair; the chair was renewed for a second term 2010 and concluded in 2017.
Mezey is a foreign member of the Hungarian Academy of Sciences.

See also
Localized molecular orbitals

References

Place of birth missing (living people)
Year of birth missing (living people)
Living people
Eötvös Loránd University alumni
University of Saskatchewan alumni
Academic staff of the University of Saskatchewan
Canadian chemists
Hungarian chemists
Canada Research Chairs
Members of the Hungarian Academy of Sciences
Hungarian emigrants to Canada
Mathematical chemistry
Computational chemists